Trade unions in Albania have had an unstable existence in recent decades, mirroring the regional political turbulance in Albania. Since the 1991 defeat of the Albanian Party of Labour (APL), independent trade unions have asserted themselves, with two main national trade union centres; the
United Independent Albanian Trade Unions (BSPSh) and the Confederation of Trade Unions (KSSh).

References

 
Union